William, Will, Willie, Bill  or Billy Cook may refer to:

Sportsmen

 William Cook (billiards player), World Champion of English billiards in the 19th century
 W. T. Cook (William Thomas Cook, 1884–1970), American college sports coach
 William Cook (Lancashire cricketer) (1881–1947), English cricketer
 William Cook (Surrey cricketer) (1891–1969), English cricketer
 William Cook (Leeds/Bradford MCCU cricketer) (born 1995), English cricketer
 William Cook (footballer) (born 1907), English footballer who played for Darlington and Gateshead
 Willie Cook (footballer) (1906–1981), Scottish footballer
 Billy Cook (footballer, born 1890) (1890–1974), English-born footballer who played for Sheffield United
 Billy Cook (footballer, born 1909) (1909–1992), Irish footballer who played for Celtic and Everton
 Billy Cook (footballer, born 1940) (1940–2017), Scottish-born footballer who played for Australia
 Bill Cook (footballer, born 1887) (1887–1949), Australian rules footballer for Carlton
 Bill Cook (footballer, born 1937), Australian rules footballer for Geelong
 Bill Cook (1895–1986), Canadian ice hockey player in the Hockey Hall of Fame
 Billy Cook (jockey) (1910–1985), Australian jockey

Politicians and judges 
 Sir William Cook, 2nd Baronet (1630–1708), member of parliament
 William Cook (British industrialist) (1834–1908), British industrialist and politician
 William Cook (MP), member of parliament for Lewes
 William Hemmings Cook (1768–1846), Canadian fur trader and politician, member of council of Assiniboia
 William Henry Cook (1874–1937), Justice of the Supreme Court of Mississippi
 William Loch Cook (1869–1942), Justice of the Tennessee Supreme Court
 Bill Cook (politician) (born 1945), Republican state senator for North Carolina

Musicians
 Willie Cook (1923–2000), American jazz trumpeter
 Antony Tudor (William Cook, 1908–1987), English choreographer
 Will Marion Cook (1869–1944), American composer and violinist

Writers and artists
 William Delafield Cook (1936–2015), Australian artist
 William Edwards Cook (1881–1959), American-born expatriate artist, architectural patron, and long-time friend of writer Gertrude Stein
 William Wallace Cook (1867–1933), American journalist and author
 Will Cook (writer) (William Everett Cook, 1921–1964), American writer of westerns

Scientists
 William Cook (computer scientist) (1963–2021), American computer scientist
 William Harrison Cook (1903–1998), Canadian chemist
 William J. Cook (born 1957), American operations researcher and mathematician
 William Richard Joseph Cook (1905–1987), Chief Scientific Adviser to the Ministry of Defence of Great Britain 1966–1970, mathematician and civil servant
 William Cook, nineteenth and early-twentieth century creator of the Orpington poultry breeds

Others
 William Cook (entrepreneur) (1931–2011), American medical equipment manufacturer
 William Cook (pioneer) (18th century), founder of Russellville, Kentucky
 William Douglas Cook (1884–1967), founder of Eastwoodhill Arboretum, now the national arboretum of New Zealand
 William R. Cook, American history professor, collaborator with Ron Herzman
 William W. Cook (1858–1930), American attorney and legal scholar
 Billy Cook (actor) (1928–1981), American actor
 Billy Cook (criminal) (1928–1952), American spree killer and mass murderer
 William Cook (1908–1987), English choreographer, better known as Antony Tudor

See also
 William Cooke (disambiguation)